Reilly Brothers and Raub Building is a historic commercial building located at Lancaster, Lancaster County, Pennsylvania. It was designed by noted Lancaster architect C. Emlen Urban and built in 1910–1911. It is a four- to five-story, "L"-shaped, steel frame structure clad in brick, pink granite, Indiana limestone, and copper in the Beaux-Arts style. The building once housed the Reilly Brothers and Raub hardware store, and now contains a mall and apartment complex, called the Central Market Mall on signs at both entrances, due to the mall's location near the Lancaster Central Market, which is at 23 North Market St.

It was added to the National Register of Historic Places in 1983.

References

Commercial buildings on the National Register of Historic Places in Pennsylvania
Beaux-Arts architecture in Pennsylvania
Commercial buildings completed in 1911
Buildings and structures in Lancaster, Pennsylvania
1911 establishments in Pennsylvania
National Register of Historic Places in Lancaster, Pennsylvania